Kim Mi-soon(Korean:김미순) is a South Korean Paralympic archer.

Kim is from Andong, South Korea. She began archery in 2010 and made her international debut in 2014.

She competed at the 2016 Summer Paralympics where she won bronze medals in the Women's individual compound open and Team compound open events.

She also won a gold medal at the 2015 World Para Archery Championship in the individual compound open event.

References

Year of birth missing (living people)
Living people
People from Andong
Paralympic archers of South Korea
Archers at the 2016 Summer Paralympics
Paralympic bronze medalists for South Korea
Paralympic medalists in archery
Medalists at the 2016 Summer Paralympics
Sportspeople from North Gyeongsang Province
21st-century South Korean women